Copyright Criminals is a 2009 documentary film directed and produced by Benjamin Franzen examining the creative and the commercial value of sampling  including the related debates over artistic expression, copyright law, and money.

Copyright Criminals was funded by the Ford Foundation, University of Iowa and John D. and Catherine T. MacArthur Foundation. It premiered in 2009 at the Toronto International Film Festival. It was broadcast nationally in the United States on 18 January 2010 on Public Broadcasting Service (PBS) on the documentary series Independent Lens.

Sampling is when musicians make an audio montage taking a portion, or sample, of a sound recording and reusing, remixing or reworking it as a separate instrumental layer or loop into another song.  It is popular with hip hop musicians.  The documentary contains interviews with several sampling artist pioneers, including hip-hop groups. A longtime area of contention from a legal perspective, early sampling used portions of other artists' recordings without permission. Once hip-hop, rap and other music incorporating sampling began generating a noticeably substantial income, the original artists began to take legal action, claiming copyright infringement and demanding high-sum royalties. Sampling artists fought back, claiming fair use.

The documentary took five years to finish (2004–2009). It is the debut film for Franzen, a graduate of University of Iowa and founder of Atlanta-based production company Changing Images, and Kembrew McLeod, a professor specializing in copyright law at University of Iowa.

Featured artists
Artists that appear in the documentary:
Aesop Rock
Shock G
Bobbito García
Chuck D
Clyde Stubblefield
De La Soul
DJ Pam the Funkstress of The Coup
DJ Qbert
Paul D. Miller aka DJ Spooky, That Subliminal Kid
Eclectic Method
El-P
Eyedea & Abilities
George Clinton
Hank Shocklee of The Bomb Squad
Harry Allen
Liquid Liquid
Mark Hosler
Matt Black
Miho Hatori
Mix Master Mike
Mr. Len
Pete Rock
Scott Herren (credited as Prefuse 73)
Sage Francis
Saul Williams
Steve Albini

See also
RiP!: A Remix Manifesto, a 2008 documentary film on the same topic

References

External links
 
 Copyright Criminals PBS page
 

2009 films
American documentary films
2009 documentary films
Works about copyright law
2009 directorial debut films
2000s English-language films
2000s American films